The Roman Catholic Diocese of Santarém may refer to:

Roman Catholic Diocese of Santarém, Brazil
Roman Catholic Diocese of Santarém, Portugal